Widespread Panic is the second studio album by the Athens, Georgia-based band Widespread Panic. It was first released by Capricorn Records and Warner Bros. Records on July 30, 1991. It was re-released in 2001 by Zomba Music Group. The album was issued on vinyl for the first time ever on July 29, 2014. The vinyl-only reissue will be distributed via ThinkIndie distribution and sold only at participating independent record stores.

The band had originally recorded material in September 1990 at producer/collaborator/friend John Keane's studio in Athens, Georgia. This session, called Mom's Kitchen, featured the majority of the songs that would eventually be recorded for Widespread Panic, along with other tracks like "A of D", "Impossible", "Machine", "Liza's Apartment (L.A.)", "Conrad", "Contentment Blues", and "Holden Oversoul", of which the latter two were included on the reissues of Space Wrangler (1988). Mom's Kitchen, however, was never released because the band signed a six-album deal with Capricorn Records in January 1991.

Recording of the album proper took place at Emerald Sound Studios (Nashville, Tennessee), Kiva Studios (Memphis, Tennessee), and Duck Tape Music Studio (Decatur, Alabama). The album features T Lavitz on keyboards and was produced by Johnny Sandlin.

For many years after the album’s release, rumors swirled that Track 7, C. Brown, was included on the album as a tribute to Camden, Alabama native Cliff Brown Jr., former singer for Tuscaloosa’s The Ecchoing Green. These rumors were thought to have been put to rest when Brown, along with Green bass player Keith Ferguson, described their adventure during a 2004 interview with The Tuscaloosa News. However, the rumors have not completely died and are still currently debated.

The band played the album in its entirety at the Charter One Pavilion in Chicago on September 2, 2009.

Track listing
All tracks written by Widespread Panic, except where noted.

"Send Your Mind" (Van Morrison) – 3:00
"Walkin' (For Your Love)" – 4:32
"Pigeons" – 6:24
"Mercy" – 6:51
"Rock" – 5:10
"Makes Sense to Me" (Daniel Hutchens) – 3:13
"C. Brown" (Widespread Panic, Jeff Riley) – 5:55
"Love Tractor" – 5:09
"Weight of the World" – 4:50
"I'm Not Alone" – 6:29
"Barstools and Dreamers" – 9:53
"Proving Ground" – 6:50
"The Last Straw" – 4:41

Personnel

Widespread Panic
John Bell – Vocals, Guitar
Michael Houser – Guitar, Vocals
Todd Nance – Drums
Domingo S. Ortiz – Percussion
Dave Schools  – Bass, Vocals

Additional musicians
T Lavitz – Keyboards
Samantha Woods – Background Vocals on "Mercy"
Wayne Jackson – Trumpet, Trombone
Andrew Love – Saxophone

Additional personnel
Johnny Sandlin – producer, engineer, mixing
Jeff Coppage – engineer, remixing
Steve Tillisch – engineer
Alan Schulman – engineer
Jim Bickerstaff – assistant engineer, mixing
Greg Archilla – assistant engineer
Johnny Walls – assistant engineer
Andrew Kautz - assistant engineer
Russ Martin – mixing assistant
Glenn Meadows – mastering
Bonnie Koloc – illustrations
William Claxton – photography
Deborah Norcross – artwork

References

External links
Widespread Panic website
Everyday Companion
PanicStream
[ All Music entry]

1991 albums
Widespread Panic albums
Capricorn Records albums
Zomba Group of Companies albums